Chassy is a commune in the Cher department in the Centre-Val de Loire region of France.

Geography
The river Vauvise forms most of the commune's southern border before entering the territory of the neighbouring commune of Laverdines, then flows back north through the northwestern part of the commune.

Population

Sights
 The church of Notre-Dame, dating from the twelfth century.
 The sixteenth-century chateau de Villiers, with a windmill.
 A seventeenth-century stone cross.

See also
Communes of the Cher department

References

External links

Chassy on the Quid website 

Communes of Cher (department)
Bituriges Cubi